Adina cordifolia, synonym Haldina cordifolia, is a flowering plant in the family Rubiaceae. It is native to southern Asia, from India east to China and Vietnam and south to Peninsular Malaysia.  It is known as haldu, kadam or kadamba in Hindi and Gáo tròn in Vietnamese.

Adina cordifolia is a deciduous tree that can grow well over 20 metres high. The flowers may be insignificant individually but can be seen as attractive when they bloom together in inflorescences with a circumference of 20–30 mm. They are usually yellow often tinged with a shade of pink. A. cordifolia usually blossoms during winter (dry season) months. The bark of the tree acts as an antiseptic.

References

External links 

Naucleeae
Rubiaceae genera
Trees of the Indian subcontinent
Flora of Yunnan
Flora of Vietnam
Trees of Thailand
Trees of Peninsular Malaysia
Trees of Vietnam